The 400 State Trail is a  rail trail between Reedsburg and Elroy, Wisconsin. It is designed for foot, bicycle, equestrian, snowmobile traffic. It is designated as a multi-use trail, offering recreational access to the routes, and is open to the public.

History 
The original railway was constructed from Madison, Wisconsin to Winona, Minnesota, starting in 1870, by a predecessor of the Chicago and North Western Railway, the Baraboo Air Line Railroad Company. It was so named because of the straightness of the Air-line railroad route. The railway became the route of the Minnesota 400, a named train of the C&NW that connected Chicago with Southern Wisconsin and Southern Minnesota. It eventually became the route of the South Dakota destined Dakota 400. The "400" trains of the C&NW were related to the C&NW flagship high-speed Twin Cities 400, which met the Minnesota 400 at Wyeville.

The State of Wisconsin acquired the railway after it was abandoned by C&NW in 1988. After renovations, they opened the trail in 1993. The trail's surface is crushed limestone. The 400 Trail is one of four connecting bike trails in west-central Wisconsin that spans approximately one-third of the state.  The trail is known for its rural scenery of the Baraboo River which it crosses eleven times. It is part of the larger Wisconsin Bike Trail System, operated by the state of Wisconsin.

The five mile spur west to Hillboro, known as the Hillsboro State Trail, was formerly the Hillsboro and Northeastern Railway. It joins the 400 State Trail just south from Union Center.

Connecting Trails 

The four connecting west central Wisconsin trails, known as the Bike 4 Trails, going from southeast to northwest are:

400 State Trail
Hillsboro State Trail 

the Elroy-Sparta State Trail

La Crosse River Trail
Great River Trail

The 400 State Trail connects to the Elroy-Sparta State Trail in Elroy.

The trail headquarters is located in a historic depot in Reedsburg and is open from May 1 through October 31. There is a $5.00 per day fee for use of the trail if one does not have the $25.00 yearly Wisconsin bike trail pass.  Bike lights are advisable even on the brightest summer days when going into the long unlit tunnels. Camping, lodging, food, parking, bike rentals and information are available at many points along the trail.

See also 

 List of rail trails
 What is a rail trail
 List of hiking trails in Wisconsin
 List of bike trails in Wisconsin

References

External links
Official website including history and campground information and maps
Reedsburg.com trail page (archived)

Rail trails in Wisconsin
Chicago and North Western Railway
Tourist attractions in Sauk County, Wisconsin
Reedsburg, Wisconsin